Mezgraja may refer to:

 Mezgraja (Babušnica)
 Mezgraja (Niš)